The Commissioners for Revenue and Customs Act 2005 (c 11) is an Act of the Parliament of the United Kingdom which combined the  Inland Revenue and HM Customs and Excise into a single government department, HM Revenue and Customs. The Act also established the Revenue and Customs Prosecutions Office, and provided for inspections of HMRC by HM Inspectors of Constabulary to ensure that it complies with the law.

In combining the two revenue departments into one, the Act implemented the recommendation of the O'Donnell Review. The Act provides for the new department to inherit the powers of the old departments, pending a comprehensive review of revenue powers.  Following some controversy in the Parliamentary debates, the Act also expressly provides for a duty to keep information confidential, with criminal penalties for wrongful disclosure.

The separation of prosecution functions to an independent body followed recommendations in the Gower Hammond Report and the Butterfield Report into failed prosecutions.

The Bill that became the Act was introduced to Parliament in the House of Commons on 24 November 2004, completed its stages in the House of Commons on 16 January 2005, completed its stages in the House of Lords on 5 April 2005.  Lords' Amendments were considered by the House of Commons on 6 April 2005 and the Act received Royal Assent on 7 April 2005.  The merger of the revenue bodies, and creation of RCPO, took effect 11 days later.

Section 53 - Commencement
The Commissioners for Revenue and Customs Act 2005 (Commencement) Order 2005 (S.I. 2005/1126 (C. 51)) was made under section 53(1).

See also
Customs

References
Halsbury's Statutes,

External links

The Commissioners for Revenue and Customs Act 2005, as amended from the National Archives.
The Commissioners for Revenue and Customs Act 2005, as originally enacted from the National Archives.
Explanatory notes to the Commissioners for Revenue and Customs Act 2005.
Progress of the Commissioners for Revenue and Customs Bill

United Kingdom Acts of Parliament 2005
HM Revenue and Customs